{{Infobox college basketball team
|current = 2022–23 Tarleton State Texans men's basketball team
|name = Tarleton State Texans
|logo = Tarleton_TonTexas.svg
|logo_size = 150
|university = Tarleton State University
|conference = Western Athletic Conference
|firstseason = 1961
|location = Stephenville, Texas
|coach = Billy Gillispie
|tenure = 2nd
|arena = Wisdom Gym
|capacity = 3,000
|nickname = Texans
|NCAAchampion = 
|NCAAfinalfour = Division II: 2005, 2015
| NCAAeliteeight        = Division II: 2005, 2006, 2015, 2016
| NCAAsweetsixteen      = Division II: 2003, 2005, 2006, 2008, 2015, 2016
| NCAAroundof32         = Division II: 2003, 2004, 2005, 2006, 2008, 2010, 2012, 2014, 2015, 2016
| NCAAtourneys          = Division II: 2002, 2003, 2004, 2005, 2006, 2008, 2010, 2011, 2012, 2013, 2014, 2015, 2016, 2017
|conference_tournament = Lone Star: 2004, 2013, 2014
|conference_season = TIAA1984, 1989, 1990, 1991

Lone Star2004, 2012, 2014, 2015''
| division_season       = LSC North: 2004LSC South: 2002, 2006, 2011
}}

The Tarleton State Texans men's basketball team, also known as the Tarleton Texans''', represents Tarleton State University, located in Stephenville, Texas, in NCAA Division I as a member of the Western Athletic Conference (WAC). Through the 2019–20 season, the team competed in NCAA Division II as a member of the Lone Star Conference.

The Texans made their Division I debut under first-year head coach Billy Gillispie for the 2020–21 season.

The team plays its games at Wisdom Gym on its campus in Stephenville.

Postseason results

CBI results
As a Division I team, the Texas have appeared in the College Basketball Invitational (CBI) once. Their combined record is 0–1.

NCAA Division II tournament results
The Texans have appeared in fourteen NCAA Division II Tournaments. Their combined record is 22–14.

References

External links